Mary Frances Garrigus (1891-1918) was Montana’s first Native American female lawyer.

She was born on August 22, 1891 in Columbus, Montana to William Garrigus and Margaret Porter. Her Crow ancestry came from her maternal side. She graduated from Billings High School in 1912. In 1918, Garrigus became the first Native American female admitted to practice law in the state upon obtaining her Juris Doctor from the University of Montana Law School, . Garrigus died on November 30, 1918 in Billings, Montana after having contracted influenza while working as a volunteer nurse.

See also 

 List of first women lawyers and judges in Montana

References 

1891 births
1918 deaths
20th-century American lawyers
20th-century Native Americans
Montana lawyers
Native American lawyers
University of Montana alumni
20th-century American women lawyers
19th-century American lawyers
20th-century Native American women
19th-century American women
Deaths from Spanish flu
People from Columbus, Montana
Crow people